Chansolme is a commune in the Port-de-Paix Arrondissement, in the Nord-Ouest department of Haiti. It has 9,561 inhabitants.

References

Populated places in Nord-Ouest (department)
Communes of Haiti